Mayflies is a novel by Kevin O'Donnell Jr. published in 1979.

Plot summary
Mayflies is a novel in which the brain of a scientist is preserved after his accidental death, and is then reprogrammed and used as the computer for a starship.

Reception
Greg Costikyan reviewed Mayflies in Ares Magazine #3 and commented that "It is [...] the fascinating portrayal of the development of a society.  O'Donnell has a master's touch; I recommend Mayflies highly."

Reviews
Review by Norman Spinrad (1980) in Destinies, Spring 1980
Review by Dave Langford (1980) in Foundation, #20 October 1980
Review by Sue Beckman (1981) in Science Fiction Review, Fall 1981
Kliatt

References

1979 American novels
1979 science fiction novels
American science fiction novels
Berkley Books books